Dnevniki is Russian pop rock band Korni's second album. The album "Dnevniki" is a solo records of each participant quartet.

Track listing

Compositions by Pavel Artemyev 
 Кто полетит?
 Не слепи
 До золы
 Крылья
 Февраль
 Что-то ещё
 Завтра я
 Москва бледнеет на зиму
 Лови моё
 Ты послушай
 Летать, падать (рыбам)
 От рассвета
 Поколение
 Америка
  Любовь
 25 этаж (remix)
 25 этаж (original version) (by Matvienko and Zhagun)

Compositions by Alexandr Astashenok 
 Небо-земля
 Я кричу
 Вспоминай меня
 Прощай, моя душа
 Сказка
 Осень здесь
 Я обязательно вернусь
 Последний бой
 25 этаж (remix)
 25 этаж (original version) (by Matvienko and Zhagun)

Compositions by Alexandr Brednikov 
 Intro
 Ты прости
 В небо
 Стань моей
 Навсегда
 Поднимите ваши руки
 Очи чёрные
 Вопрос-ответ
 Голос небес
 Льёт дождь
 Последний поцелуй
 Ты красивая
 Ты прости (remix)
 25 этаж (remix)
 25 этаж (original version) (by Matvienko and Zhagun)

Compositions by Alexey Kabanov 
 Горькая луна
 Человечек
 Такси
 The return
 А ты ушла
 Дождливая ночь
 Blow my mind
 Та девушка (original mix)
 Про несчастную любовь
 От фанов
 25 этаж (remix)
 25 этаж (original version) (by Matvienko and Zhagun)

Musical style 
 Compositions by Pavel Artemyev and Alexandr Astashenok contain sophisticated arrangements, active use of live instruments and a strong influence rock. A composition Alexandr Brednikov and Alexey Kabanov gravitate towards dance-pop and electronica.
 Tracks Pavel Artemyev close to the first album Splean – they are also a little psychedelic. In addition to alternative rock there is the influence of trip hop.
 Tracks Alexandr Astashenok contain the influence of alternative rock, modern hard rock, pop rock and folk music (particular in song "Skazka").
 Tracks Alexandr Brednikov this Contemporary R&B. There is also a cover song in style tango.
 Tracks Alexey Kabanov this  drum and bass and jungle.
 Added to all albums pop rock and Europop song "25 Etazh" written by Igor Matvienko.

References

External links
 Официальный сайт «Фабрики Звёзд-1»

2005 albums